Coffee production in the Dominican Republic is based mainly in the mountain regions of the country, in the  highlands which form at least one-half of the area of Hispaniola. Introduced to the country in 1715, the Dominican Republic bean is larger and thicker than Martinique's. The major coffee variety grown in the country is Arabica (known internationally as “mild”). Robusta is also grown but only in about 1.3% of the land area; it is consumed locally.

History
Coffee was first introduced in the Dominican Republic in 1715 and has been the principal crop of the small scale farmers. Coffee began to be exported circa 1872. In the early 20th century, the crop was cultivated in all the Cibao, principally in the district of Puerto Plata. Important coffee areas in 1918 were in Moca, Santiago and Baní, with approximately 66% of the crop exported from Puerto Plata.

There are five major coffee producing regions, four of them being in the hilly region – the Central Mountain Region, the Northern Mountain Region, the Neyba Mountain Range, and the Bahoruco Mountain Range. There were 40,000 to 50,000 farmers operating in this sector.

Production

See also
Economy of the Dominican Republic

References

Bibliography
 

Dominican Republic
Economy of the Dominican Republic
Agriculture in the Dominican Republic